The London Philatelic Exhibition 1890 was held 19–26 May at the Portman Rooms, Baker Street, London. It was one of the first international philatelic exhibitions anywhere and it was the exhibition at which the Duke of Edinburgh announced that Prince George of Wales, later King George V, was a stamp collector. The exhibition marked the fiftieth anniversary of the introduction of penny postage and the issue of the first stamps.

Souvenirs
About 2700 unissued Mauritius Britannia-seated stamps were overprinted L.P.E. 1890 in red from imperforate sheets remaindered in 1872. The original printers, Perkins Bacon, perforated the stamps at the exhibition and overprints and varieties were additionally made by M.P. Castle.

Exhibitors and awards
Prominent exhibitors and some of their awards included:
Thomas Tapling
Major E.B. Evans
Edward Denny Bacon
M. P. Castle - Gold medal for display of New South Wales
Ludwig Schwarz
Dr Emilio Diena
Anthony de Worms
The Earl of Kingston - Gold medal for display of Great Britain
Douglas Garth - Gold medal for display of India and Ceylon
Louis Blanchard - Gold medal for display of Switzerland
Gilbert Harrison - Gold medal for United States stamped envelopes

Printers showing their works included:
Blades, East & Blades
Perkins Bacon
Waterlow & Sons

Other exhibitors included:
The Board of Inland Revenue
The British Post Office
The Government of New South Wales
The Government of Tasmania
The Government of India
The Government of Victoria
The Government of Cape of Good Hope
The Crown Agents
The British North Borneo Company

See also
List of philatelic exhibitions (by country)

References

External links
British Stamp Exhibitions - Victoria

1890
1890 in London
May 1890 events